Erwin Bernard Swiney, Jr. is a former cornerback in the National Football League. He was a member of the Green Bay Packers for three seasons, though he did not see any playing time with the team in a regular season game during his final season. He also played with the Cologne Centurions of NFL Europe in 2004.

College statistics 

Notes - Statistics include bowl game performances.

References

External links
Nebraska Cornhuskers bio

People from Dallas
Green Bay Packers players
Cologne Centurions (NFL Europe) players
American football cornerbacks
Nebraska Cornhuskers football players
1978 births
Living people
Lincoln Northeast High School alumni